The Tulsa State Fair is an annual event held at Expo Square in Tulsa, Oklahoma. The modern fair takes place in late September (occasionally beginning early October) and lasts 11 days.

History
The local fair officially began in the late 1890s as a street fair.  The Tulsa County Free Fair began in 1903, at the Western Association baseball park in downtown Tulsa, located at Archer Street and Boston Avenue.  This event continued through the years until 1913, when the International Dry Farming Congress was established in Tulsa that allowed agriculturalists from all over the world a more appropriate place to gather.

In 1913, with the enactment of the Oklahoma Free Fair Act and with Tulsa's ability to attract the International Dry Farming Congress, a  tract of land north of Archer Street and Lewis Avenue was purchased and would be the home of the Tulsa State Fair for the next 13 years.

In 1923, the Tulsa Fairgrounds were moved to a 240-acre lot, donated by Tulsa oilman J. E. Crosbie, between Fifteenth and Twenty-first Streets in midtown Tulsa.  The donation of the land was just the beginning of what would grow into one of the most premier fairs in the country.

In 1926, it was decided that a group needed to be established in order to make decisions over the new location that is now the present-day fairgrounds and Expo Square.  The $500,000 bond issue in 1931 provided funds to construct the art deco-style Tulsa Fairgrounds Pavilion and make other necessary improvements, which led to the 1935 legislation that elevated the small local free fair to state fair status.

In 1949, the Tulsa State Fair merged with a spring livestock show to bring livestock events to the fair.  In 1966, The International Petroleum Exposition (IPE) Center, now known as the SageNet Center, was built and made into a major part of the fair.  During the 1970s, updates were made and year-round marketing began around the complex.  It was at this time the fairgrounds were renamed Expo Square.  Updates were made throughout the Pavilion, and a 13,000-seat grandstand was built.

The Tulsa County Public Facilities Authority has administered the fair since 1983. The authority consists of three Tulsa County commissioners and two at-large delegates.

Expo Square now holds hundreds of events each year, with the Tulsa State Fair being one of the only events that it produces internally. The annual Tulsa State Fair opens on the fourth Tuesday after Labor Day.

No fair was held in 1917 and 1918 due to World War I, nor in 1942 through 1945 due to World War II.

In 2020, the state fair's board of directors announced the cancellation of the 2020 fair due to the COVID-19 pandemic in Oklahoma. That year, the fair had only allowed junior livestock shows and certain vendors.

Events and entertainment 
There are many different attractions at the Tulsa State Fair, which include thrill and kiddie rides on the Midway, agricultural exhibits located in the Built Ford Tough Livestock Complex, grounds entertainment, educational exhibits and more.

The largest facility at the fairgrounds is the SageNet Center (formerly the River Spirit Expo, Exposition Center, and International Petroleum Exhibition Building).  Inside, vendors and exhibit booths line the entire floor, providing both educational and money-saving experiences (many vendors offer special "state fair" pricing in order to attract customers).

See also

State fair
Oklahoma State Fair

References

External links
Tulsa State Fair
Wade Shows, Inc.
Murphy Brothers Expositions
Expo Square

 
Fairs in Oklahoma
History of Oklahoma
Oklahoma culture
State fairs
September events
October events
Tourist attractions in Tulsa, Oklahoma
Festivals established in 1903
1903 establishments in Oklahoma Territory